Spath  may refer to:
 Spath, a British village
 Leonard Frank Spath (1882–1957), a British paleomalacologist
 an abbreviation for the plant Spathiphyllum

See also
 Späth, a disambiguation page

fr:Spath